Jean-Pierre Poly (born 1941) is a French historian. He was the student of Georges Duby, and graduated with a Phd in History in 1972. He specializes in feudalism.

References

Sources

1941 births
21st-century French historians
French medievalists
Legal historians
Living people
Place of birth missing (living people)
Date of birth missing (living people)